The following is a list of podcasts about racism.

List

References 

Racism
Works about racism